Oxydia cubana, the Cuban spanworm moth, is a species of geometrid moth in the family Geometridae. It is found in the Caribbean and North America.

The MONA or Hodges number for Oxydia cubana is 6968.

References

Further reading

 
 
 
 
 
 
 
 
 
 

Ourapterygini
Moths described in 1906